Sudislavl is an urban locality (an urban-type settlement) and the administrative center of Sudislavsky District of Kostroma Oblast, Russia, situated  from Kostroma and  northeast of Moscow. Population:

History

In the Middle Ages, Sudislavl was a town with its own timber kremlin. Ivan IV's testament from 1572 is the first document that mentions Sudislavl. A later chronicle from the local Resurrection monastery claims that Sudislavl existed as early as 1360.

In the 17th and 18th centuries Sudislavl was considered a "merchant town". The local merchants financed the construction of several stone churches which survive to this day. The Old Believers emerged as the dominant religious group in the district.

By the beginning of the 20th century, Sudislavl had entered a period of steady decline. It has not been ranked as a town since 1925.

References

Urban-type settlements in Kostroma Oblast
Populated places in Sudislavsky District
Defunct towns in Russia
Kostromskoy Uyezd